Perlin may refer to:

Places
 Perlin, Germany, municipality in Mecklenburg-Vorpommern, Germany

People
 Amy Perlin, American rabbi
 Bernard Perlin (1918–2014), American painter
 Don Perlin (born 1929), American comic book artist
 Evgeny Perlin (born 1990), Belarusian journalist and television presenter
 Gary Perlin, American chief financial officer
 Jenny Perlin (born 1970), American artist
 Ken Perlin, American computer scientist
 Marshall Perlin (1920–1998), American lawyer
 Rae Perlin (1910–2006), Newfoundlander painter
 Vera Perlin (1902–1974), Canadian human rights activist
 Vladimir Perlin (born 1942), Belarusian cellist

Other uses 
 Perlin (falconry), hybrid between a peregrine falcon and a merlin
 Perlin noise, computer graphics technique

See also
 Purlin, in building construction, a horizontal roof member